Kim Edri (born c. 1992) is an Israeli beauty queen who won the title of Miss Israel Universe 2011 and represented her country in the Miss Universe 2011 pageant.

References

External links

Living people
Israeli beauty pageant winners
Miss Universe 2011 contestants
1990s births
People from Sderot
Israeli people of Moroccan-Jewish descent
Miss Israel delegates